Charles E. Loizeaux (January 22, 1889 – March 7, 1947) was an American politician who served in the New Jersey Senate from 1933 to 1941.

References

1889 births
1947 deaths
Majority leaders of the New Jersey Senate
Mayors of Plainfield, New Jersey
Republican Party New Jersey state senators
Presidents of the New Jersey Senate
20th-century American politicians